Aiden Deborah A. H. Curtiss is a British-American fashion model.

Early life
Curtiss was born in London, England, to Guinean-born model Katoucha Niane and menswear designer Nigel Curtiss. She moved to New York when she was 9.

She is the stepdaughter of Victoria's Secret EVP of Public Relations Monica Mitro.

Career
Curtiss has modeled for Zac Posen, Marc Jacobs, Miu Miu, Stella McCartney, Dolce and Gabbana, Fendi, Balmain, Versace, Zuhair Murad, Roland Mouret, Thom Browne, Off-White, Anna Sui, Missoni, Prabal Gurung, and Bottega Veneta.

She has appeared in editorials for Vogue Italia, Vogue Japan, and Vogue Holland.

In 2017, for the first time she walked in the Victoria's Secret Fashion Show in Shanghai, China.

References

Living people
1998 births
Models from London
English people of Guinean descent
Models from New York City
American people of Guinean descent
The Society Management models
British emigrants to the United States
Elite Model Management models
Black British women
African-American female models
21st-century African-American people
21st-century African-American women